Freudian Corduroy is the debut album by the band Ist, released in 2004.

Track listing
All songs by Ist

"This is Where We Came In" – 4:03
"The Station" – 5:09
"Boyfriend" – 3:49
"Dust" – 4:04
"Let's to Bed" – 2:53
"Pay for This" – 5:43
"Similarly Inclined"  – 3:00
"Lowtide" – 4:42
"Wallpaper Wendy Pt. 1" – 0:43
"This Sin" – 5:20
"Don't Look At Me That Way" – 3:30
"Moment of Release" – 4:44

Personnel
Kenton Hall - guitar, keyboards, vocals
Jack Bomb - guitar, vocals
Detroit Robbins - bass
Flash - percussion, drums
Jon Read - trumpet, trombone
Drew Stansall - sax
Belinda Burnard - violin
Sarah Dale - cello

References

2004 debut albums